Summertime is a 1969 album by American jazz saxophonist Paul Desmond featuring performances recorded in 1968 and released on the CTI label.

Reception 

Allmusic reviewer Richard S. Ginell states "The result is a beautifully produced, eclectic album of music that revives Desmond's "bossa antigua" idea and sends it in different directions, directly toward Brazil and various Caribbean regions, as well as back to the jazzy States... Never before had Desmond's alto been recorded so ravishingly".

Track listing
 "Samba (Struttin') With Some Barbeque" (Lil Hardin Armstrong, Don Raye) - 4:26
 "Olvidar" (Don Sebesky) - 5:33
 "Ob-La-Di, Ob-La-Da" (John Lennon, Paul McCartney) - 2:12
 "Emily" (Johnny Mandel, Johnny Mercer) - 4:45
 "Someday My Prince Will Come" (Larry Morey, Frank Churchill) - 3:07
 "Autumn Leaves" (Joseph Kosma, Johnny Mercer) - 3:00
 "Where Is Love?" (Lionel Bart) - 5:30
 "Lady in Cement" (Hugo Montenegro) - 3:08
 "North by Northeast" (Paul Desmond) - 4:30
 "Summertime" (George Gershwin, DuBose Heyward) - 3:54

Recorded at Van Gelder Studio in Englewood Cliffs, New Jersey on October 10 (tracks 7 & 10), October 16 (tracks 4 & 9), October 24 (tracks 2 & 5), November 5 (track 8), November 20 (tracks 1 & 6), and December 26 (track 3), 1968.''

Personnel 
Paul Desmond - alto saxophone
Wayne Andre (2,3,5), Paul Faulise (1,2,3,4,5), Urbie Green (1,2,3,4), J. J. Johnson (1,4), Bill Watrous (1,2,3,5), Kai Winding (1,2,3,4,5) - trombone
Burt Collins (1,2,3,4,6), John Eckert (2,3,5), Joe Shepley, Marvin Stamm (1,2,3,4,5) - trumpet, flugelhorn 
Ray Alonge (1,2,3,4,5), Jimmy Buffington (1,2,3,4), Tony Miranda (2,3,5) - French horn
George Marge (6) - flute, oboe
Bob Tricarico (6) - flute, bassoon 
Herbie Hancock (1,2,3,4,5) - piano
Jay Berliner (1,4), Joe Beck (5), Eumir Deodato (8), Bucky Pizzarelli (3) - guitar
Frank Bruno (6), Ron Carter (1,2,3,4,5) - bass
Leo Morris (1,2,3) - drums
Mike Mainieri (1,4) - vibraphone
Joe Venuto (6) - marimba 
Jack Jennings (1,4), Airto Moreira (1,4) - percussion
Don Sebesky - arranger

References

CTI Records albums
Paul Desmond albums
1969 albums
Albums produced by Creed Taylor
Albums arranged by Don Sebesky
Albums recorded at Van Gelder Studio